Jerome Ambrose Lewis (January 14, 1890 – October 25, 1962) was an American Negro league infielder who played in the 1910s.

A native of Memphis, Tennessee, Lewis attended Talladega College. He made his Negro leagues debut in 1910 with the West Baden Sprudels. He went on to play four seasons with the Sprudels, and also played for the Leland Giants in 1913. Lewis died in French Lick, Indiana in 1962 at age 72.

References

External links
 and Seamheads

1890 births
1962 deaths
Leland Giants players
West Baden Sprudels players
Baseball infielders
Baseball players from Memphis, Tennessee
20th-century African-American sportspeople